Motivos Personales was a Spanish-language mystery thriller television series produced by Round Productions, Globomedia and Picasso's Studio and distributed by Warner Bros.' international unit. The show ran for 2 seasons between February 1 and December 13, 2005, and was broadcast on Telecinco for the entirety of its run.

Synopsis 
The story begins on the feast commemorating the 50th anniversary of the Acosta Laboratories. All seems well until the secretary of the president of the laboratories, Mara Yimou appears dead against a glass ceiling inside the building. At first, evidence indicates that the culprit is the husband of journalist Natalia Nadal, Arturo Acosta.  At trial he is found guilty and thrown in prison.  Natalia later learns from a video that the judgement was based on false evidence and will tell her husband in jail, but she finds that her husband had committed suicide.  From this moment, Natalia begins to investigate with her friend Virginia, attorney of the laboratories, and together they're drawn into a complicated network of secrets and crimes. The causes of deaths go back many years back and are the result of a cold revenge on Natalia.

Cast

Main characters 
 Lydia Bosch - Natalia Nadal (Arthur Acosta's widow) (journalist) protagonist
 Marta Calvó - Virginia Palazón / Victoria Castellanos (Acosta Laboratories's attorney) antagonist
 Pedro Casablanc - Pablo Acosta (Federico's son) antagonist
 Ginés García Millán - Fernando Acosta (Federico's son)
 Fernando Guillén - Federico Acosta (President of Acosta Laboratories)
 Concha Velasco - Aurora Acosta (Federico's sister) Antagonist

Recurring characters 
 Daniel Freire - Daniel Garralda (journalist Natalia's friend)
 Belén López - Maite Valcárcel (reporter Natalia's friend)
 Ana Gracia - Berta Pedraza de Acosta (Pablo Acosta's wife)
 Begoña Maestre - Tania Acosta Nadal (Natalia and Arthur's daughter)
 James Meléndez - Alberto Pazos (partner of Acosta Laboratories)
 Eugene Barona - Larranz (police)
 Jan Cornet - Jaime Acosta Pedraza (Paul and Berta's son)
 Miguel Angel Silvestre/Alex Gonzalez - Nacho Mendoza (friend of James and Tania Santos and Victoria's son)
 Tony Martinez - Ricardo Molina (director of "It's news") (first season)
 Sonia Castelo - Isabel Tejero (reporter Natalia's enemy)
 Elena Ballesteros - Silvia Márquez (financial director of Acosta Laboratories) (second season)
 Miguel Ramiro - Martin Gaínza/Miguel Ballester (New Director of "It's news") (second season)
 Asier Etxeandía - David (second season)
 Arturo Arribas - Pedro Guillén (chemist of Acosta Laboratories)

Episodic 
 Menh-Wai Trinh - Mara Yimou (Federico's secretary)
 Chema Muñoz - Arturo Acosta (chemist of Acosta Laboratories)
 Paca Barrera - Adriana (forensic Natalia's friend)
 Ana Labordeta - Rosa (Federico's new secretary)
 Roberto Quintana - Mario Villar (Arturo's attorney)
 Cristina Segarra - Ana Lopez
 Manuel de Blas - Gonzalo Pedraza (Berta's father and DTV's partner)
 Liz Lobato - Arcangel
 Charo Zapardiel - Judge
 Luis Zahera - Joaquín Gálvez (witness in favor of Arturo Acosta)
 Isidoro Fernandez - Prison doctor
 Alejandro Casaseca - Cardenas (murderer)
 Eleazar Ortiz - July Velázquez (ex-lover and owner of Virginia Prolab)
 Aitor Mazo - Juan Villarroel (Acosta Laboratories's enemy)
 Chus Castrillo - Aganzo\Sandra Suner (ex-member of the White Company)
 Amparo Vega - Diana Vicente (Acosta Laboratories's counsellor)
 Arthur Querejeta - Holgado (Acosta Laboratories's counsellor)
 Marian Álvarez - Esther (Tania's friend)
 Isabel Ampudia - Teresa Forner (Pardo's widow)
 Esperanza de la Vega - Angeles Martorell\Gabriela (Santos's widow and Arcangel's bride)
 Ines Morales - Gloria Nunez (Federico's ex-lover)
 Alex O'Dogherty - Antonio Cruz (DTV's ex-employee)
 Karmele Aramburu - (provincial prison director)
 Pilar Massa - Leticia (prison doctor)
 Usun Yoon - Mara Yimou
 Ion Lion - Editor
 Manolo Solo - Fiscal

Special recurring guests 
 Lluís Homar - Andrew Mercader
 Txema Blasco - Guillermo del Valle
 Alicia Borrachero - Cruz Gándara
 Angels Barceló

Episodes

Season 1

Season 2

Awards and nominations

External links 

 motivos-personales

Telecinco original programming
2005 Spanish television series debuts
2005 Spanish television series endings
2000s Spanish drama television series
Spanish thriller television series
Television series by Globomedia